Moody Currier (April 22, 1806 – August 23, 1898) was an American lawyer, banker, patron of the arts, and Republican politician from Manchester, New Hampshire.

Moody Currier (Jr) was born in Boscawen, New Hampshire, USA.  Son of Rhoda Putney who was unmarried at his birth. His father was Moody Currier (Sr) and was never reported to have been involved in his life.  Moody Currier Sr was the son of Dr. John Currier.

Currier married three times first to Lucretia C. Dustin then to Mary W. Kidder, and thirdly to Hannah A. Slade.

Currier was the owner and editor of the Manchester Democrat newspaper.

Currier ran unsuccessfully in the 1848 Manchester, New Hampshire mayoral election.

In 1856 to 1857 Currier served in the New Hampshire State Senate serving as President of the Senate in 1857.  From 1860 to 1861 Currier was on the Governor's Council. Currier served as a fellow at Bates College from 1882 to 1889. He was the 40th governor of New Hampshire from 1885 to 1887.

Manchester's Currier Museum of Art is named after him and was founded based on a bequest in his will and the accompanying efforts of his third wife, Hannah Slade Currier.

Currier died in Manchester in 1898 and is buried in Valley Cemetery.

References

 History of Putney Family in America by Willis B. Putney, 1979, NH History Society Library, Concord, NH

External links
Currier at New Hampshire's Division of Historic Resources
Currier Museum of Art - see especially their history page

1806 births
1898 deaths
Politicians from Manchester, New Hampshire
Republican Party governors of New Hampshire
American Unitarians
Republican Party New Hampshire state senators
Members of the Executive Council of New Hampshire
People from Boscawen, New Hampshire
American newspaper publishers (people)
Dartmouth College alumni
19th-century American journalists
American male journalists
19th-century American male writers
19th-century American politicians
Burials at Valley Cemetery
19th-century American businesspeople